Sanda Ham (20 August 1959) is a Croatian linguist and publicist. She is editor of the Croatian linguistic magazine Jezik.

Personal life 
She was born in 1959 in Osijek, where she attended elementary and grammar school as well as the Faculty of Pedagogy where she graduated in 1982. She received her postgraduate degree in linguistics (Croatian studies) at the Faculty of Humanities and Social Sciences in Zagreb in 1988. Her dissertation was on passive sentences in standard Croatian. Six years later she received a doctor's degree with a dissertation about language of Croatian novelist Josip Kozarac. Her academic mentor both in postgraduate and doctoral degree was Stjepan Babić.

Career 
In 2004 she became executive editor of Jezik, for which she had been a contributor since 1996. She served on the editorial board of linguistic magazine Jezikoslovlje (Linguistics) for two years. Her work has been published in Croatian literary magazines, such as Književna revija (Osijek), Filologija (Zagreb), Fluminensija (Rijeka), Riječ (Budapest), Dometi (Rijeka) and others. She writes for political magazine Hrvatski tjednik.

She was elected as one of 22 Heroes of all times, people prominent and notable in their field of work, by listeners of Croatian Radio.

Personal life 
She is a married and a mother of one child. She lives with her family in Osijek.

Publications 
 Jezik zagrebačke filološke škole, Matica hrvatska, Osijek (1998)
 Školska gramatika hrvatskoga jezika, Školska knjiga, Zagreb (2002, 2nd edition - 2007, 3rd edition - 2009, 4th edition - 2012, 5th edition - 2017)
 Hrvatski školski pravopis (coauthors Stjepan Babić and Milan Moguš), Školska knjiga, Zagreb  (2005, 2nd edition - 2008, 3rd edition - 2009, 4th edition - 2012)
 Povijest hrvatskih gramatika, Globus, Zagreb (2006)
 Hrvatski jezični savjeti (coauthors Jadranko Mikolo, Borko Barban and Alen Orlić), Školska knjiga, Zagreb (2014)

References 

Living people
1959 births
People from Osijek
University of Zagreb alumni
Linguists from Croatia